Marko Jakšić may refer to:

Marko Jakšić (footballer, born 1983), Serbian association football player 
Marko Jakšić (footballer, born 1987), Serbian association football player

kome da uzme prase, za pretplatu